Shazia Ilmi (born 1970) is an Indian politician. She was previously a television journalist and anchor at Star News. She led a media campaign for an anti-corruption bill (to institute an ombudsman popularly known as the Jan Lokpal Bill). She was a member of the Aam Aadmi Party's National Executive but left the party in May 2014 and joined the Bharatiya Janata Party in January 2015.

Early life
Shazia Ilmi comes from a middle-class Kanpur-based Muslim family with links to the Indian National Congress political party. Her father, Maulana Ishaq Ilmi, was the founder and editor of Siyasat Jadid, a Kanpur-based Urdu newspaper. Her brother is Aijaz Ilmi, a member and spokesperson of the Bharatiya Janata Party. Her sister is married to Arif Mohammed Khan, a former Indian National Congress politician and Union Minister who recently was appointed as the Governor of Kerala.

Ilmi was educated at St. Mary's School in Kanpur and Nainital and then at St. Bede's College, Shimla. She then completed degree courses in journalism and broadcasting at Jamia Millia Islamia and the University of Wales, Cardiff, and also completed a diploma in 16mm film production at New York Film Academy.

In January 2017, Ilmi was appointed the additional director (non-official part-time independent) of Engineers India Ltd (EIL) from 27 March 2017 to 30 January 2020.

She is married to Sajid Mallik.

Television career
Ilmi spent 15 years in varied aspects of television news and documentary production. She has been an anchor on Star News, where she hosted and produced the popular prime time news show Desh Videsh.

Ilmi has been a member of the International Association of Women in Radio and Television. Her film titled P.O. 418 Siyasat Kanpur, concerning the struggle for survival of an Urdu language newspaper, was screened at the IAWRT film festival in 2011 and also at events such as a similar festival in Kerala. She was also a co-director, with Radha Hola, of a 1996 documentary concerning the eco-feminist Vandana Shiva. This film, called Daughter of the Earth — Portrait of Vandana Shiva, has been shown by various television broadcasters, including the Discovery Channel.

Politics
She was a member of the National Executive of the Aam Aadmi Party and was seen in a sting operation, along with other AAP leaders such as Kumar Vishwas, allegedly accepting money for the party in return for favours. She offered to withdraw her candidature in the Delhi legislative assembly elections of 2013. which the party has rejected after going through the entire raw footage, calling the operation a political conspiracy. The Election Commission ordered an inquiry regarding the legitimacy of the video.

She contested the Lok Sabha elections, 2014 for the AAP from Ghaziabad but lost to V. K. Singh. After this, being unhappy with the party's leadership, she resigned her party membership on 24 May 2014.

Ilmi joined the BJP on 16 January 2015.

References

Living people
Indian women activists
Freedom of information activists
21st-century Indian Muslims
People from Kanpur
Aam Aadmi Party candidates in the 2014 Indian general election
Women in Delhi politics
1970 births
Former members of Aam Aadmi Party from Delhi
Bharatiya Janata Party politicians from Delhi
Indian women television journalists
Indian television journalists
Indian anti-corruption activists
Activists from Delhi
21st-century Indian women politicians
21st-century Indian politicians
21st-century Indian women writers
21st-century Indian journalists
Journalists from Delhi
Women writers from Delhi
Jamia Millia Islamia alumni